Malka is a Jordanian town located in the north of Irbid on the border with Syria (opposite the Golan Heights). It is one of the largest villages in Bani Kinanah Department. It enjoys  one of the most beautiful areas of Jordan at all, characterized by fertile soil and abundant springs. It has the largest pond in the north of Jordan. The inhabitants of the town are from different clans, but they all belong to Malka; so they are called "Malkawi clan".

Geography
Malka is located on a mountainous agricultural land with red soil. It is about 91 km from the capital Amman and from Irbid 22 km. It rises about 500 meters above sea level and is bordered to the east by Hatem and Abder, from the west by Umm Qays, from the north by Syria, from the south by Dukra and Kufr Asad. The total area of the organized land is approximately 1,700 dunums, and for the unorganized lands, it is about 8,096 dunums. Malka owned by Khalid bin al-Walid municipality, headed by Hussein Al-Malkawi.

History 
The town overlooks the famous ancient Roman city of Jadara, which was one of the ten cities that made up the Decapolis union.

In August 636 happened a big battle in Malka called Battle of Yarmouk between the Rashidun Caliphate and the Byzantine Empire.

In 1838  Malka's inhabitants were predominantly Sunni Muslims.

The Jordanian census of 1961 found 1,634 inhabitants in Malka.

Population
Most of people who lives in Malka are from Malkawi clan, which it is claimed to be related to the  prophet Muhammad.

Notable Figures 
Sheikh Ahmad bin Rashid bin Tarqan Al-Malkawi, grew up in Damascus, where he worked and worked in jurisprudence and hadeeth, he was mentioned in Extensive response book. He died in the year between 1400 and 1401.
Suhaib Al Malkawi announcer on Al Jazeera
Abdallah Malkawi announcer on France 24
Mohammad Al-Malkawi is a Jordanian general that held the post of Chairman of the Joint Chiefs of Staff of the Jordanian Armed Forces from 18 July 1999 to 5 March 2002.

References

Bibliography

 

Populated places in Irbid Governorate